Route 97, or Highway 97, may refer to:

Australia 
 - Olympic Dam Highway, South Australia

Canada
 British Columbia Highway 97
 British Columbia Highway 97A
  British Columbia Highway 97B
  British Columbia Highway 97C
  British Columbia Highway 97D
  British Columbia Highway 97E (former)
  British Columbia Highway 97W (former)

India
National Highway 97 (India), now part of National Highway 24

Korea, South
Gukjido 97

New Zealand
  New Zealand State Highway 97

United States
 Interstate 97
 U.S. Route 97
 Alabama State Route 97
 Arizona State Route 97
 Arkansas Highway 97
 Colorado State Highway 97
 Connecticut Route 97
 Florida State Road 97
 County Road 97 (Escambia County, Florida)
 County Road 97A (Escambia County, Florida)
 Georgia State Route 97
 Idaho State Highway 97
 Illinois Route 97
 Illinois Route 97A (former)
 Iowa Highway 97 (former)
 Kentucky Route 97
 Louisiana Highway 97
 Maine State Route 97
 Maryland Route 97
Maryland Route 97A
 Massachusetts Route 97
 M-97 (Michigan highway)
 Minnesota State Highway 97
 Missouri Route 97
 Nebraska Highway 97
 New Hampshire Route 97
 County Route 97 (Bergen County, New Jersey)
 New Mexico State Road 97
 New York State Route 97
 County Route 97 (Dutchess County, New York)
 County Route 97 (Jefferson County, New York)
 County Route 97 (Rockland County, New York)
 County Route 97 (Saratoga County, New York)
 County Route 97 (Steuben County, New York)
 County Route 97 (Suffolk County, New York)
 North Carolina Highway 97
 North Dakota Highway 97
 Ohio State Route 97
 Oklahoma State Highway 97
Pennsylvania:
 Pennsylvania Route 97 (Adams County)
 Pennsylvania Route 97 (Erie County)
 South Carolina Highway 97
 Tennessee State Route 97
 Texas State Highway 97
 Texas State Highway Spur 97
 Farm to Market Road 97
 Utah State Route 97
 Virginia State Route 97
 West Virginia Route 97
 Wisconsin Highway 97

See also
A97 road
B97
European route E97
F-97 (Michigan county highway)
N97
Route 97 (MTA Maryland), a bus route in Baltimore, Maryland
London Buses route 97